SPEW may refer to: 
Society for Promoting the Employment of Women, a British organisation founded in the 19th century
Spam Prevention Early Warning System, an anonymous service
"Spew", a short story by Neal Stephenson published in the anthology Hackers  
"Society for the Promotion of Elfish Welfare", an organization founded by Hermione Granger in the Harry Potter series of novels
Socialist Party of England and Wales a Trotskyist political party in The United Kingdom
A slang term for vomiting